Megan Twohey is an American journalist with The New York Times. She has written investigative reports for Reuters, the Chicago Tribune, and the Milwaukee Journal Sentinel. Twohey's investigative reports have exposed exploitative doctors, revealed untested rape kits, and uncovered a secret underground network of abandoned unwanted adopted children. Her investigative reports have led to criminal convictions and helped prompt new laws aimed at protecting vulnerable people and children.

On October 5, 2017, Twohey and fellow New York Times journalist Jodi Kantor published a report about Harvey Weinstein detailing decades of sexual abuse allegations, and more than 80 women publicly accused Weinstein of sexually abusing or assaulting them. This led to Weinstein's firing and helped to ignite the viral #MeToo movement started by the American activist Tarana Burke. That work was honored in 2018, when The New York Times was awarded the 2018 Pulitzer Prize for Public Service. Kantor and Twohey won the George Polk award and were named to Time magazine's list of 100 most influential people of the year. Twohey and Kantor subsequently authored a book which chronicled their report about Weinstein, titled She Said. The book was published in 2019, and adapted into a film of the same name in 2022. In addition to winning the 2018 Pulitzer Prize for Public Service, Twohey was a finalist for the Pulitzer Prize for Investigative Reporting in 2014.

Biography 
Twohey is from Evanston, Illinois. She went to Evanston Township High School, and graduated from Georgetown University in 1998. Twohey's parents were both involved in news media; her mother Mary Jane Twohey produced news for television and her father John Twohey was an editor for the Chicago Tribune. Twohey initially joined The New York Times in 2016 to investigate Donald Trump's tax history, possible business ties to Russia, and his past treatment of women. Twohey is currently a regular contributor for The New York Times.

Investigative reports

Untested rape kits 
In 2009, Twohey reported in the Chicago Tribune that several suburban police departments around Chicago were not submitting all rape kits for testing. In the following year, Illinois became the first U.S. state to require every rape kit be tested, and many other states in the U.S. followed soon after.

Predatory doctors 
From 2010 to 2011, Twohey published a series of articles in the Chicago Tribune detailing cases of doctors who had been convicted of violent felonies or sex crimes and were still practicing and abusing patients. Her reporting has been credited for leading to new legislation and policies in Illinois aimed at protecting patients, for example requiring background checks for healthcare providers.

Abandoned children 
In 2013, Twohey published an investigative report in Reuters News that detailed how some people in the United States were using the internet to find places to abandon their adopted children. Several segments of this story were broadcast on the Nightly News and the Today Show on NBC. She received a Sydney Award and the Michael Kelly Award for her work revealing these underground networks. Twohey was a finalist for the Pulitzer Prize for this work.

Donald Trump 
In 2016, Twohey and Michael Barbaro published several investigative pieces to The New York Times about sexual misconduct by then-presidential candidate Donald Trump. She continued to report on the incidents into 2017. Trump threatened to sue The New York Times if they did not take down the articles. The articles stayed up.

Weinstein sexual abuse 

On October 5, 2017, Twohey and Jodi Kantor co-wrote a New York Times exposé on sexual misconduct by Harvey Weinstein. Twohey said they were encouraged to investigate untold stories, and that Dean Baquet, executive editor, and Rebecca Corbett, head of investigative projects, had supported them even though Weinstein had threatened to sue The New York Times, and the exposé risked hurting advertising money. Twohey and Kantor had two in-person meetings with Weinstein. Twohey, Kantor, and Corbett also had multiple conversations with Weinstein's lawyers and publicists. A follow-up piece with fellow reporter Ellen Gabler added more allegations and expanded the Weinstein timeline. Twohey said it was an emotional experience when she began seeing friends and family using the #MeToo on her social media feed in the aftermath of the Weinstein allegations. Jezebel announced in 2018 Twohey and Kantor were publishing an international book, set to be published in Spring 2019, based on their investigation that would reveal more about what happened. They received a Sidney Award for their exposé. They were also given L.A. Press Club's Inaugural Impact Award and the McGill Medal for Journalistic Courage from the Grady College of Journalism. The New York Times won the 2018 Pulitzer Prize for public service for Twohey's and Jodi Kantor's reporting, sharing the award with Ronan Farrow at The New Yorker, as well as the 2018 Gerald Loeb Award for Investigative business journalism.

She Said 

Twohey and Kantor authored a book which chronicled their exposé into Weinstein and the structures of power that enabled him, titled She Said: Breaking the Sexual Harassment Story that Helped Ignite a Movement, which was published by Penguin Books in September 2019. In 2022, the book was adapted into a film of the same name. The film is directed by Maria Schrader from a screenplay by Rebecca Lenkiewicz. Twohey is played by Carey Mulligan.

Suicide forum investigation
Starting in 2021, Twohey and Gabriel Dance have been publishing articles in The New York Times about a website operated in the United States that extra-legally facilitates suicide. They found the website is situated within a broader, network of forums which encourage misogynistic violence. According to Twohey and Dance, the website primarily promotes an obscure suicide method involving ingestion of a meat preservative. Twohey and Dance found those involved with the website have encouraged the suicides of reported individuals with curable conditions, including a young man who was coaxed into suicide after only a minor stomach ailment.

Twohey and Dance found that the recovery subforum on the site was a ruse, as they reported a founder told prospective members they would not be allowed to join only to use that subforum. The reporters state part of their investigation was uncovering the full names of the founders of the site, which were later republished by many other media outlets. They named the creators of the website as Diego Galante and Lamarcus Small, who both self-describe as "blackpilled" incels. Twohey and Dance mention how site founders and staff coordinated to conceal the forum activities from law enforcement and also helped with preparations for user suicides.  Twohey and Dance reported they found the identities of 50 people who died in connection to the website, including children.

Transgender healthcare

In November 2022, a piece co-written by Twohey for The New York Times came under sharp criticism from medical experts and trans activists for its criticizing the use of puberty blockers to treat trans youth. The World Professional Association for Transgender Health published a statement in response calling the article "misinformation about the science behind the care of trans youth", and Science-Based Medicine released a piece addressing the article, saying that "the reporting ignored evidence and important context to weave a narrative portraying puberty blockers as far more risky than they actually are".

Chase Strangio of the ACLU pointed to the article as an example of how media rhetoric fuels anti-trans violence.

Slate magazine described the piece as "fearmongering", and noted that it "does not seem to trust the medical consensus view", while many trans voices were quoted by Fox News as referring to the piece as a "moral panic piece" and "anti-trans propaganda". Teen Vogue sharply criticized the authors of the article themselves, noting that "they fail to meaningfully investigate the most compelling reason why medical providers consider puberty blockers in trans and gender diverse youth: These medications save lives" and saying that the article itself "could further marginalize a population that is already medically vulnerable and politically under siege".

Personal life 
Her father John Twohey is a journalist who
was Chicago Times magazine editorial director in 1989, joined the Chicago Tribune in 1977, after serving for five years as design director of The Washington Post. Earlier in his career, he served as press secretary for Sargent Shriver's 1972 Democratic vice presidential run and for Senator Fred R. Harris (D-Okla.). Megan's mother Mary Jane Twohey worked as a Congressional aide and as a news producer at WETA-TV in Washington, D.C. before serving for many years as a spokesperson and media-relations manager for Northwestern University in Evanston, Illinois. Twohey's husband, Jim Rutman, is a literary agent.

References

External links

Year of birth missing (living people)
Living people
21st-century American journalists
21st-century American women writers
American women journalists
Chicago Tribune people
Georgetown University alumni
Journalists from Illinois
MSNBC people
The New York Times Pulitzer Prize winners
The New York Times writers
Writers from Evanston, Illinois
Gerald Loeb Award winners for Investigative
Pulitzer Prize for Public Service winners